Paul Antoine Jean Charles, duc de Bauffremont (11 December 1827, Palermo, Italy - 2 November 1893, Paris, France) was a French general, most notable for leading the 'Charge de Sedan' alongside Gaston Alexandre Auguste. He was also the first husband of Valentine de Riquet de Caraman-Chimay, whom he divorced in 1875.

1827 births
1893 deaths

Dukes of Bauffremont